This is the complete list of (physical and digital) number-one singles sold in Finland in 2014 according to the Official Finnish Charts. The list on the left side of the box (Suomen virallinen singlelista, "the Official Finnish Singles Chart") represents physical and digital track sales as well as music streaming, the one in the middle (Suomen virallinen latauslista, "the Official Finnish Download Chart") represents sales of digital tracks and the one on the right side (Suomen virallinen radiosoittolista, "the Official Finnish Airplay Chart") represents airplay.

Chart history

See also
List of number-one albums of 2014 (Finland)

References

Number-one singles
Finland Singles
2014